Vryotopos is a village and a community of the Tyrnavos municipality. Before the 2011 local government reform it was a part of the municipality of Ampelonas. The 2011 census recorded 560 inhabitants in the village and 585 in the community. The community of Vryotopos covers an area of 27.245 km2.

Administrative division
The community of Vryotopos consists of two separate settlements: 
Mikrolithos (population 25)
Vryotopos (population 560)

Population
According to the 2011 census, the population of the settlement of Vryotopos was 560 people, a decrease of almost 8% compared with the population of the previous census of 2001.

See also
 List of settlements in the Larissa regional unit

References

Populated places in Larissa (regional unit)
Tyrnavos